SSHS is an abbreviation for the Saffir–Simpson hurricane scale.

It can also be used as an abbreviation for several high schools:
 Saipan Southern High School
 Saratoga Springs High School
 Seoul Science High School
 South Shore High School (disambiguation)
 Speedway Senior High School
 Sugarloaf Senior High School
 Sheboygan South High School
 South Sydney High School
 South Salem High School
 Southport State High School